The 2006 Rhode Island Rams football team was an American football team that represented the University of Rhode Island in the Atlantic 10 Conference during the 2006 NCAA Division I FCS football season. In their seventh season under head coach Tim Stowers, the Rams compiled a 4–7 record (2–6 against conference opponents) and finished fifth in the North Division of the Atlantic 10 Conference.

Schedule

References

Rhode Island
Rhode Island Rams football seasons
Rhode Island Rams football